Valentín Beperet (18 December 1926 – 21 February 1989) was a Chilean footballer. He played in one match for the Chile national football team in 1953. He was also part of Chile's squad for the 1953 South American Championship.

References

External links
 

1926 births
1989 deaths
Chilean footballers
Chile international footballers
Place of birth missing
Association football defenders
Unión Española footballers